The Huntsville Tigers is a women's American football team located in Huntsville, Alabama. The Tigers played their first season of full-contact football in the spring of 2012. This was the Tigers' first season as a new team. The team consists of former Alabama Renegades and Tennessee Valley Tigers players as well as a number of new players.

History

Alabama Renegades
Women's football has existed in the Huntsville area since the fall of 2000 when the Alabama Renegades first came into existence.  The Renegades were one of the founding teams of the National Women's Football Association (NWFA).  In the fall 2000, the Alabama Renegades and the Nashville Dream played a six-game exhibition season to determine the viability of a women's full-contact football league. The exhibition games were a huge success and the National Women's Football Association (NWFA) expanded to 12 teams in its first full season of play in the spring of 2001. Ray Quinn was the man who first brought full-contact football to Huntsville and he owned the team for two years.

Nancy Byrd, a Renegades player, took over the team from Quinn in 2003.  Byrd continued to play for the Renegades while owning the team.  At the end of the 2008 season Byrd retired from playing and put the team up for sale.  Byrd later stated: "I decided to retire from playing and no one was willing to take on the responsibility of running this team. I appreciate the opportunity Ray and Catherine Masters (NWFA founder) gave me to play football", stated Byrd.  The NWFA league ceased operations that same year.

Tennessee Valley Tigers

Carlos Mathews, the former offensive coordinator for the Renegades, realized the potential for women's football in the Huntsville area and decided to explore ways to bring the game back for a 2009 season.  Mathews researched several leagues but only found one with the stability needed to support women's football in the Huntsville Area.  The Tigers officially joined the Independent Women's Football League (IWFL) on August 12, 2008, as a Tier II team.  On October 24, 2011, after learning that Carlos Matthews wasn't bringing the team back, former player Carmelesia Sullivan looked into forming a team.

Huntsville Tigers
Sullivan formed the Huntsville Tigers from former Tennessee Valley Tigers players.  In the first season of play, the Tigers finished with a 5–3 record, losing twice to the Chattanooga Locomotion - another Tier II team - and once to the Atlanta Xplosion - a Tier I team in 2009.  The Tigers also defeated then ranked number seven Clarksville Fox who in the 2008 season had competed for the  Independent Women's Football League Tier II championship.  The Tigers played their home games at Milton Frank Stadium in Huntsville, Alabama.  Because of the devastating effects of the 2011 Super Outbreak, the Tigers had to forfeit their final two regular-season games.  On August 30, the Tigers announced they had left the IWFL to join the WSFL.

Season-By-Season

|-
|2000 || 3 || 3 || 0 || Exhibition Season || --
|-
|2001 || 5 || 3 || 0 || 2nd Southern || --
|-
|2002 || 7 || 2 || 0 || 1st Central || Lost Southern Conference Semifinal (Pensacola)
|-
|2003 || 7 || 4 || 0 || 2nd Southern Central || Won Southern Conference Quarterfinal (Asheville)Lost Southern Conference Semifinal (Pensacola)
|-
|2004 || 6 || 3 || 0 || 2nd Southern Gulf Coast || --
|-
|2005 || 5 || 3 || 0 || 7th Southern || --
|- 
|2006 || 4 || 4 || 0 || 3rd Southern Southeast || --
|- 
|2007 || 3 || 5 || 0 || 3rd Southern Central || --
|- 
|2008 || 2 || 6 || 0 || 4th Southern East || --
|- 
!Totals || 42 || 33 || 0 ||  || 
|-
|colspan="2"| 

|-
| colspan="6" align="center" | Tennessee Valley Tigers (IWFL)
|-
|2009 || 5 || 3 || 0 || 10th Tier II || --
|-
|2010 || 4 || 4 || 0 || 3rd Tier II East Southeast || --
|-
|2011 || 1 || 7 || 0 || 5th East Mid-South || --
|-
| colspan="6" align="center" | Tennessee Valley Tigers (WSFL)
|-
|2012* || -- || -- || -- || -- || --
|-
!Totals || 10 || 14 || 0
|colspan="2"| 

* = Current Standing

2011 schedule

** = Won by forfeit
*** = Forfeited

Single season records

2011 roster

2012 season

Staff
 Owner/Offensive Coordinator - Carlos Mathews
 Offensive Line Coach - Ella Banghart
 Assistant Defensive Coach - JJ Johnson
 Delegate - Brady Wakefield 
 Marketing/Sales - Jamie Flynt 
 Acting General Manager - Carson Wakefield

Notes

External links
Tennessee Valley Tigers official website

American football teams in Alabama
American football teams established in 2000
Independent Women's Football League
American football in Huntsville, Alabama
Women's Spring Football League teams
Women's sports in Alabama
2020 establishments in Alabama